This is a list of minister from Nitish Kumar's fifth cabinet starting from 22 February 2015. Nitish Kumar is the leader of JD(U), who was sworn in the Chief Ministers of Bihar in February 2015 with help of Mahagathbandhan which included RJD and INC.

History
Nitish Kumar took oath as Bihar Chief Minister along with 28 ministers, including RJD chief Lalu Prasad’s two sons Tejashwi Yadav and Tej Pratap in the grand alliance government of RJD, JD(U) & INC.

Council of MinistersNitish Kumar’s Bihar team: 7 Masters, 9 graduates and 12 who went to schoolUproar in Bihar Legislative Council as Minister Bijendra Prasad Yadav calls BJP 'Bakwas Jumla Party' 

|}

See also 

 Government of Bihar
 Bihar Legislative Assembly
 Sixth Nitish Kumar ministry

References

Janata Dal (United)
2015 in Indian politics
Bihar ministries

Rashtriya Janata Dal
Indian National Congress
Nitish Kumar
2015 establishments in Bihar
Cabinets established in 2015
2017 disestablishments in India
Cabinets disestablished in 2017
5